The war rug ( farš jangi) tradition of Afghanistan has its origins in the decade of Soviet occupation of Afghanistan from 1979 and has continued through the subsequent military, political and social conflicts. Afghan rug-makers began incorporating the apparatus of war into their designs almost immediately after the Soviet Union invaded their country. They continue to do so today in the wake of the United States' 2001 invasion of Afghanistan which ousted the Taliban government of Mullah Omar but has failed to bring an end to violence in the country.  The rugs produced in response to these events are among the world's richest traditions of war art of the late 20th and early 21st centuries.

The terms Baluch and war rug are generalisations given to the genre by rug dealers, commercial galleries, collectors, critics, and commentators. The distinctive characteristic of these rugs is their capacity to convey their makers' experiences and interpretations of the circumstances and politics of war and conflict in the region.

Since the withdrawal of the USSR, the same themes and subjects have been reused and remade.  Additionally, after 9/11 the events of that day were recorded in carpets, and more recently – since 2015 – drones have appeared as subject matter.

Literature
  and Hans Werner Mohm: Lebensbaum und Kalaschnikow. Krieg und Frieden im Spiegel afghanischer Bildteppiche, Gollenstein Verlag (publishers), Blieskastel (in Germany), 2000, . (This is the first known serious and detailed study of any substance in the field of the so-called "War Rugs" from Afghanistan.)
 Tim Bonyhady, Nigel Lendon and Jasleen Dhamija: The rugs of war, Canberra : Australian National University, School of Art, Gallery, 2003. 
 Enrico Mascelloni: War Rugs: The Nightmare of Modernism, Skira, 2009, .
 Till Passow & Thomas Wild (ed.): Knotted Memories: War in Afghan Rug Art, Catalogue to accompany the exhibition featuring selected pieces from Till Passow's collection of Afghan war rugs, 27 February – 20 March 2015 (German and English), Berlin 2015, .
 Kevin Sudeith; War Rugs Volume One:Pictorial,   Mosques, monuments, minarets, and modern cities in war rugs from 1981 through 2010. This book demonstrates how some war rugs grew out of the long tradition of landscape pictorial rugs as well as the way contemporary weavers combined ancient religious and martial architectural structures with the most high tech imagery.

References

External links
 
 War Rug Styles War rug database by Kevin Sudeith. Started in 1998 this is the most comprehensive index of war rugs available.
 Rug-of-War by Mimi Kirk, Smithsonian, 4 February 2008
 Traditional Afghan patterns and war rugs Traditional Afghan rug patterns relationship to war rugs. 
 Rugs of War, Blog by Nigel Lendon and Prof.  of the Australian National University
 Drones Are Now Appearing on Afghan Rugs by Cosimo Bizzarri, The Atlantic, 30 January 2015
 Art in Review, Rugs from Afghanistan by Holland Cotter, The New York Times, 11 February 2005
 La fascinante et triste histoire des tapis de guerre afghans, Postap Magazine, 18-09-2018 by Cyprien Rose. 
 Carpet Bombing by Christopher Helman, Forbes Magazine 22 December 2003
 Rugs Depict Terror Attack, but New York Isn't Ready for 9/11 Kitsch by Corey Kilgannon, The New York Times, 15 December 2003
Despite Conflict and Repression, Creativity by Tammy La Gorce, The New York Times, 29 March 2014

Afghan rugs and carpets